Toad Hall may refer to:
 Toad Hall (The Wind in the Willows), the fictional residence of Mr. Toad in The Wind in the Willows
 Toad Hall (ANU), a residential hall in Australian National University

See also
 Hardwick House, Oxfordshire
 Mapledurham House in Oxfordshire
 Fawley Court in Buckinghamshire